Phetogo Molawa is South Africa's first black female helicopter pilot in the South African Air Force and the South African National Defence Force. She is currently a captain in the South African Air Force. In 2018 she became the first woman and the first black person to take command of a South African Air Force installation; specifically, she became the new commanding officer of the South African Air Force base in Port Elizabeth.

She was born at Thaba Nchu near Bloemfontein in 1986 and joined the South African Air Force after leaving school.

References

South African Air Force personnel
Living people
Helicopter pilots
1986 births
Female military personnel
African women in war